The Chief of the General Staff is the Chief of the  of the Slovenian Armed Forces. That person is appointed by the Government of Slovenia, after his/her nomination by the Minister of Defence. The current Chief of the General Staff is Major general .

List of chiefs of the general staff

Chief of the Republican Staff of the Slovenian Territorial Defence (1990–1993)

Chiefs of the General Staff of the Slovenian Armed Forces (1993–present)

See also
 Slovenian Territorial Defence
 Slovenian Armed Forces

References

Military of Slovenia
 
Slovenia